Sailing is an event at the Island Games, the biennial multi-sports event for island nations, territories and dependencies.

Sailing at the Island Games was first introduced as a sport in 1995.

Sailboarding (or as it is sometimes called Windsurfing, which was only invented in 1948), started earlier, in 1993.

All the participants in the Games are surrounded by water (except Gibraltar), so water sports are attractive.

 Sailing 
 - Laser Standard Rig	- A maximum of 2 entries per Member Island.
 - Laser Radial Rig - A maximum of 2 entries per Member Island.
 - The team positions shall be calculated by adding the points of each team’s best three places for each race sailed (this is not necessarily the same 3 sailors in each race).
 - Age - minimum 13

 Sailboarding 
 - A maximum of 4 entries per Member Island.
 - The team positions shall be calculated by adding the points of each team’s best three places for each race sailed (this is not necessarily the same 3 sailors in each race).
 - Age - minimum 13

Events

Top Medalists

Sailing

Sailing Laser Standard Rig

Sailing Laser Radial Rig

Sailing Team

Sailboarding

Sailboarding Individual

Sailboarding Long Distance Individual

Sailboarding Team Event

References 

 
Sports at the Island Games
Island Games